Felipe Alfonso Zang (born 21 May 1994) is a Brazilian footballer who plays for Cianorte as a central defender.

Club career
Born in Santa Helena, Paraná, Zang began his career with Guarani de Venâncio Aires, making his senior debuts with the side in 2012, in Campeonato Gaúcho Série A2. On 20 June 2012 he moved to Grêmio, returning to youth football.

On 13 August 2013 Zang joined Corinthians, also being assigned to the under-20s. He appeared with the side in Copa São Paulo de Futebol Júnior, also training with the main squad in September 2013.

On 3 September 2014 Zang signed for Sampaio Corrêa, in Série B. He made his professional debut on 11 October, starting in a 2–2 away draw against América-RN but being replaced in the 9th minute due to an injury.

On 5 January 2015 Zang joined Série A side Chapecoense, after agreeing to a one-year deal.

Honours
Grêmio
Taça Belo Horizonte de Juniores: 2012

References

External links

1994 births
Living people
Sportspeople from Paraná (state)
Brazilian footballers
Association football defenders
Campeonato Brasileiro Série B players
Sampaio Corrêa Futebol Clube players
Associação Chapecoense de Futebol players
Esporte Clube Cruzeiro players